"Shut 'Em Down" is the fourth single from Public Enemy's fourth studio album Apocalypse 91...The Enemy Strikes Black.

Chuck D of Public Enemy explained to Melody Maker in 1991: "'Shut 'Em Down' is about major corporations like Nike taking profits from the black community, but not giving anything back, never opening businesses in black areas. And it's saying that the best way to boycott a business is to start your own."

Part of group member Chuck D's voice was sampled on the track "Ten Crack Commandments" by The Notorious B.I.G., off the album Life After Death.

The opening of the song was used by Russell Simmons Television Productions (RSTV) during the closing credits of Def Comedy Jam.

This song was used in the 2008 thriller film Lakeview Terrace, the 2009 video game Madden NFL 10 and the 2014 video game NBA 2K15.

A mashup of the song with The Prodigy's "Stand Up" was created by fan Pony Sixfinger, who posted it on his YouTube channel. After Liam Howlett of The Prodigy saw it, the band released an official version of the mashup, the song "Shut 'Em Up". (The new release's title was a combination of the words from the two original songs' individual titles, making the title, like the song itself, a mashup.) The song was included as a bonus track on the expanded edition of The Day Is My Enemy. The mashup was eventually used in a commercial for Nike, and as the opening song for the Showtime documentary series Shut Up And Dribble.  The song was also used in the movie Fist Fight.

Charts

References

1991 singles
1991 songs
Public Enemy (band) songs
Music videos directed by Mark Pellington